James Charles Stewart (7 September 1850 – 20 December 1931) was a Scottish-born Australian politician. He was a Member of the Queensland Legislative Assembly and later the Australian Senate.

Early life
Born in Grantown-on-Spey, Morayshire, he received a primary education after which he worked as a farm and railway worker.

In 1888 he migrated to Australia, where he became involved in the unions movement. He edited the People's Newspaper in Rockhampton in Queensland.

Politics
James Stewart sat on Rockhampton Council.

In 1893, he was elected to the Legislative Assembly of Queensland as the member for Rockhampton North.

In 1901, he left the Assembly to successfully contest the Australian Senate as a Labour candidate for Queensland. He remained in the Senate until his defeat in 1917.

Later life

Stewart died in 1931 at Strathpine, Queensland and was buried in Lawnton Cemetery.

References 

Australian Labor Party members of the Parliament of Australia
Members of the Australian Senate for Queensland
Members of the Australian Senate
1851 births
1931 deaths
20th-century Australian politicians
Members of the Queensland Legislative Assembly
Australian Labor Party members of the Parliament of Queensland